The Virginia Tech Hokies men's soccer team represents the Virginia Polytechnic Institute and State University in all NCAA Division I men's college soccer competitions. The Hokies are members of the Atlantic Coast Conference and play their home matches at Sandra D. Thompson Field.

Historically, Virginia Tech has been one of the weaker outfits in the ACC, regularly finishing towards the bottom of the conference standings. The program's most successful era came briefly in the early to mid-2000s, where the five years, the Hokies earned three berths into the NCAA Division I Men's Soccer Championship. In 2003 and 2005, the Hokies made their first two appearances in the tournament, where they reached the second round of the tournament. In 2007, the team made a remarkable run to the College Cup, making their deepest run in tournament history. Since their 2007 run, they did not qualify for an NCAA Tournament bid again until 2016.

History

Oliver Weiss era, NCAA violations

The improved greatly with the arrival of head coach Oliver Weiss in 2000.  Under Weiss, Tech has made four appearances in the NCAA Tournament (second round in 2003, 2005, first round in 2006, and the semifinals in 2007), the only four in school history.  The team is currently ranked fourth in the nation under the Division I NSCAA/adidas National Rankings (last updated Tuesday, November 6, 2007).  In the 2007 season, the team achieved its highest national ranking in school history when they reached #4 on October 23.  The previous highest ranking was in the 2005 season at eighth in the country.  Also, Tech set a new school record with a 15-game unbeaten streak (10-0-5 from September 2 to November 3) during the 2007 season.

The popularity for the team and game attendance has increased since the invitation to the Atlantic Coast Conference and with the 2006 FIFA World Cup. 2008 was by all accounts a rebuilding year, as the Hokies went winless (0-8) in ACC play.

In 2009, Coach Weiss resigned, days before the school self-reported recruiting violations to the NCAA in connection with Weiss allegedly fronting application fees for recruits.  Per NCAA rules, paying for a recruit's application fees, even if the recruit repays the loan, is not permitted. Mike Brizendine, a Weiss assistant and former head coach of Bridgewater College, was promoted to head coach to replace him.

Notable events

On September 11, 2011, the Hokies defeated the UNC Tar Heels 1–0 in extra time, making it one of the largest college soccer upsets of the 2011 season. Tech, at the time was unranked, while North Carolina was ranked first in the nation.

Rivalries

Radford

A local derby between the two sides, Virginia Tech regularly plays against the Radford Highlanders men's soccer program.

Virginia

Virginia Tech's major rival in soccer is the Virginia Cavaliers men's soccer program. The two sides have a longstanding rivalry across all sports which translates over to soccer. Generally, matches between the two sides attract larger than average crowds. In the 2005–06 and 2006-07 school years, the program-wide rivalry was called the Commonwealth Challenge. A renewed rivalry competition began for the 2014–15 season, called the "Commonwealth Clash."

Roster

Seasons

Source:

 A10 Standings source
 ACC Standings source
 Big East Standings source

Notable players

 Patrick Nyarko
Chris McNally
Eric McClellan
Ray Crittenden
Marcelo Acuna
Tarik Walker
Alessandro Mion
 Jonathan Cruicky 
Andre Thomas 
 Juan Pablo Saavedra

References

External links
 Official website

 
1972 establishments in Virginia
Association football clubs established in 1972